The Romanian IT Union (SITT) is Romania's first trade union for people working in the IT and outsourcing sector. It represents 3,000 workers at four different firms; Nokia, Wipro, Accenture and Atos.

History 
SITT was formed in 2009, when a French European Works Council member at Alcatel-Lucent (Nokia) notified Romanian workers of the company's plans to outsource one third of all jobs to the Romanian branch of Wipro. SITT organized strike actions, hired a legal team (rare in Romania) and signed a collective agreement with Alcatel-Lucent on 22 December 2009, a few days before the outsourcing was finalised. SITT continues to represent workers at both Alcatel-Lucent and Wipro, taking a geographic approach instead of a typical firm-enterprise approach to labour organising. In 2011, Romania changed its labour code, raising the threshold for companies to recognise unions to 50% of workers. In 2012, SITT won representation of workers at Accenture. In 2017, workers of Atos won legal recognition by SITT.

Affiliation 
SITT is affiliated with the Romanian national trade center Cartel Alfa and the global union federation UNI Global Union.

See also 

 Tech union

References

External 
 

Trade unions in Romania
Tech sector trade unions
2009 establishments in Romania
Trade unions established in 2009